My Pleasure Is Your Pleasure is a 1973 commedia sexy all'italiana anthology film written and directed by  the cinematographer , at his writing and directorial debut. It is loosely based on Honoré de Balzac's novel Les Contes drolatiques.

Plot

Cast 

 Ewa Aulin: Marquise Cavalcanti
 Femi Benussi: Countess  Joselita Esteban De Fierro / Rosalia
 Lionel Stander: Marquis Cavalcanti / Cardinal of Ragusa
 Barbara Bouchet: Prostitute
 Erna Schürer: Grand Duchess 
 Aldo Giuffrè: Grand Duke
 Sylva Koscina: Dyer's Wife
 Leopoldo Trieste: Dyer
 Marisa Solinas: Maid of the Grand Duchess
 Anna Maestri 
 Umberto Raho: Treasurer of the Grand Duke
 Pupo De Luca   
 Giacomo Furia: Bishop of Coira

See also
 List of Italian films of 1973

References

External links

Commedia sexy all'italiana
1970s sex comedy films
Films based on works by Honoré de Balzac
1973 comedy films
1973 films
1970s Italian films